Oleksandr Petrovych Livik (UA, Лівік Олександр Петрович;) born on June 30, 1970, Mykolaiv Ukrainian SSR — Ukrainian politician, People's deputy of Ukraine of the VIII convocation

Education 
 1987 — 1992  — Kyiv High Tank Engineer College after Marshal Yakubovskyi, cadet;
 1992 — 1996  — Kyiv Institute of Ground Forces, a director of software group;
 In 2009 graduated from the Institute of Post-Graduate Education of Lviv Commerce Academy, specialist in finances.
 In 2013 he got a PhD Degree in Economic Science in Mykolayiv National Agrarian University of Ministry of Agrarian Policy and Food of Ukraine

Carrier 
 1996 — 1999  — a deputy director of LTD «Fagot»;
 1999 — 2001  — a director of LTD «Fagot»;
 2001 — 2008  — a deputy president, a director of wine-cognac plant LTD «Zelenyi Gai»;
 Since 2002 — was elected a deputy of Mykolayiv Region Council.
 Since 2007 — a vive-president of All Ukraine Conference of winemakers and gardeners, a president of Mykolayiv Regional Football Federation for Children and Youth, President Emeritus*** of Voznesensk Regional Children's Sport Public Organization "Football Club «Gelenyi Gai».
 Since 2008 — a deputy director of the Chairman of Executive Board (vice-president) LTD «Zelenyi Gai».
 2010 — 2014  — a deputy of Mykolaiv Regional Council.
 November 27, 2014 — people's deputy of Ukraine of the VIII convocation, party "Petro Poroshenko Bloc”,
Chairperson of the subcommittee on alternative and renewable energy sources of the Verkhovna Rada of Ukraine Committee on Fuel and Energy Complex, Nuclear Policy and Nuclear Safety

Family
Married, has a son.

External links

 Parliament of Ukraine, official web portal

Living people
Ivan Chernyakhovsky National Defense University of Ukraine alumni
Party of Regions politicians
Petro Poroshenko Bloc politicians
Eighth convocation members of the Verkhovna Rada
Politicians  from Mykolaiv
1970 births